Neon Yang, formerly JY Yang, is a Singaporean writer of English-language speculative fiction best known for the Tensorate series of novellas published by Tor.com. The first Tensorate novella, The Black Tides of Heaven, was a finalist for the 2018 Hugo Award, Locus Award, Nebula Award, World Fantasy Award, and Kitschie Award. The third Tensorate novella, The Descent of Monsters, was a finalist for the 2019 Lambda Literary Award for LGBTQ SF/F/Horror. Their debut novel, The Genesis of Misery, the first book in The Nullvoid Chronicles, is scheduled for release in 2022 by Tor Books.

Biography 
Yang is non-binary and queer, and uses they pronouns. They legally changed their name to "Neon" in 2020. They have a master's degree in creative writing from the University of East Anglia and were a member of the 2013 class of the Clarion West Writers Workshop.

Career 
Yang has published short fiction since 2012 in publications such as Clarkesworld, Lightspeed Magazine, Uncanny Magazine, Apex Magazine and Strange Horizons. Their novelette, "Waiting on a Bright Moon" was a top ten finalist for the 2018 Locus Award for Best Novelette. Their novelette, "Circus Girl, The Hunter, and Mirror Boy" was a finalist for the 2020 Ignyte Award. Their novelette, "A Stick of Clay, in the Hands of God, Is Infinite Potential" was a top ten finalist for the 2021 Locus Award for Best Novelette.

Their Tensorate series of novellas began in 2017 with the simultaneously released The Black Tides of Heaven and The Red Threads of Fortune, which were published by Tor.com to critical acclaim. The Black Tides of Heaven received a starred review from Publishers Weekly, which called it "a captivating Buddhist-inspired steampunk setting" that "captures an epic sweep in compact, precise prose", and a positive review from Library Journal, which called it (and its sibling volume, The Red Threads of Fortune) "an impressive, fresh debut steeped in Chinese culture". The Red Threads of Fortune was also reviewed by Publishers Weekly, which said "though not as gripping as [The Black Tides of Heaven], the novella authentically depicts trauma and lays promising groundwork for future books in the series". The Black Tides of Heaven was a finalist for the 2017 Nebula Award for Best Novella, the 2018 Hugo Award for Best Novella, the 2018 World Fantasy Award for Best Novella, and the 2018 Kitschies Golden Tentacle, and was named one of the 100 best fantasy novels of all time by a Time magazine panel. The Tensorate series continued with the novellas The Descent of Monsters in 2018 and The Ascent to Godhood in 2019. The Descent of Monsters was a finalist for the 2019 Lambda Literary Award for LGBTQ SF/F/Horror. The Ascent to Godhood received a positive review from Publishers Weekly, which called it "a thrilling adventure [that] stands alone, as well as providing moving, complicated backstory for the earlier books".

Yang's debut novel, The Genesis of Misery, the first in The Nullvoid Chronicles trilogy, was announced by Tor Books in 2020, to be released in September 2022, and described as a retelling of the story of Joan of Arc as a mecha space opera.  The Genesis of Misery received a starred review from Publishers Weekly, which called it a "vibrant tour de force" and "a triumph", noting that it "presents a simultaneous embrace and inversion of Chosen One narratives" and its "themes of faith, suffering, queerness, and duty".

Themes 
Yang's work revolves around "the human body as a vessel for storytelling", and is based on their background as a molecular biologist, journalist and science communicator. They have described themself as "a deep pessimist about human nature," saying that "the best we can do is to recognize this and mitigate that assholic nature when we can. I think, ultimately, that’s what most of my stories end up being about." They have referenced David Mitchell, Helen Oyeyemi, and William Gibson as influences on their writing.

Yang has described their Tensorate novellas as "queer Asian science fantasy." The series has been described as "silkpunk" by reviewers.

Bibliography

Novels 
The Nullvoid Chronicles trilogy
 The Genesis of Misery, Tor Books, 2022

Novellas

Tensorate series 
 The Black Tides of Heaven, Tor.com, 2017, 
 The Red Threads of Fortune, Tor.com, 2017, 
 The Descent of Monsters, Tor.com, 2018, 
 The Ascent to Godhood, Tor.com, 2019, 
The four volumes were collected in an omnibus edition: The Tensorate Series, Tor.com, 2021,

Standalone 
Between the Firmaments, Book Smugglers Publishing, 2018

Other short fiction

Collections 
 The Ayam Curtain, Math Paper Press, 2012, ed. as June Yang with Joyce Chng,

Stories

See also
 List of fantasy authors
 List of LGBT writers
 List of science-fiction authors

References

External links

Interviews
Author Spotlight: JY Yang, Xander Odell, Lightspeed Magazine, issue #68, 2016
Asian Science Fiction, Fantasy, & Horror: A Round Table Discussion, Aliette de Bodard, Mithila Review, 2016
JY Yang: Energy Systems, Francesca Myman, Locus Magazine, 2018
Interview: JY Yang, Christian A. Coleman, Lightspeed Magazine, issue #98, 2018

Year of birth missing (living people)
Living people
Alumni of the University of East Anglia
Non-binary writers
Singaporean short story writers
Singaporean LGBT writers
21st-century Singaporean writers
Queer people
21st-century LGBT people
Queer writers